Vernon Hazel (28 October 1889 – 18 April 1967) was an Australian rules footballer who played for St Kilda, Melbourne and Essendon in the Victorian Football League (VFL).

Family
The son of Pieter Jan (a.k.a. Peter John) Hazewinkel (-1923), and Louisa Wilhemina Hazewinkel (-1917), née von Weihen, Vernon Percy Hazewinkel was born in Prahran on 28 October 1889. He married Margaret Hazel Sindrey (1894–1977) in 1917.

Football
Hazel was recruited from Coburg and in one and a half seasons at St Kilda managed just three appearances. During 1910 he crossed to Melbourne and the following season he joined his third club, Essendon. He was the beneficiary of an injury to Allan Belcher in the finals series and lined up as a back pocket in the 1911 Grand Final win. Also used at half forward, Belcher finished his career back in the Victorian Football Association (VFA) with Brighton.

Boxing
In 1916 Hazel was the amateur welterweight champion of Victoria, he entered the professional ranks in September of that year.

Footnotes

References
Holmesby, Russell and Main, Jim (2007). The Encyclopedia of AFL Footballers. 7th ed. Melbourne: Bas Publishing.

External links

 Vernon Hazel, demonwiki.org.
Vern Hazel, at The VFA Project.

1889 births
1967 deaths
Australian rules footballers from Melbourne
Australian Rules footballers: place kick exponents
St Kilda Football Club players
Melbourne Football Club players
Essendon Football Club players
Essendon Football Club Premiership players
Brighton Football Club players
Coburg Football Club players
One-time VFL/AFL Premiership players
People from Prahran, Victoria